Khatayan (also Romanized as Khāţāyān) is a village in Tus Rural District, in the Central District of Mashhad County, Razavi Khorasan Province, Iran. At the 2006 census, it had a population of 90.

References 

Populated places in Mashhad County